Hawaii County (officially known as the County of Hawaii) is a county in the U.S. state of Hawaii in the Hawaiian Islands. It is coextensive with the Island of Hawaii, often called the "Big Island" to distinguish it from the state as a whole. The 2020 Census population was 200,629. The county seat is Hilo. There are no incorporated cities in Hawaii County (see Hawaii Counties). The Hilo Micropolitan Statistical Area includes all of Hawaii County. Hawaii County has a mayor–council form of government. Hawaii County is the largest county in the state in terms of geography.

The mayor of Hawaii County is Mitch Roth, who took office in 2020. Legislative authority is vested in a nine-member Hawaii County Council.

Hawaii County is one of seven counties in the United States to share the same name as the state they are in (the other six are Arkansas County, Idaho County, Iowa County, New York County, Oklahoma County, and Utah County).

Geography

The county's land area comprises 62.7 percent of the state's land area. It is the highest percentage by any county in the United States. (Delaware's Sussex County comes in second at 48.0 percent, while Rhode Island's Providence County is third at 39.55 percent.)

Major highways

Adjacent county
Maui County - northwest

Demographics

, the island had a resident population of 185,079. There were 64,382 households in the county. The population density was 17.7/km2 (45.9/mi2). There were 82,324 housing units at an average density of 8/km2 (20/mi2). The racial makeup of the county was 34.5% White, 29.2% from two or more races, 22.6% Asian, 12.4% Native Hawaiian or other Pacific Islander and 0.7% African American; 11.8% of the population were Hispanics or Latinos of any race. The largest ancestry groups were:

9.8% Japanese
9.6% German
8.6% Filipino
8.5% Native Hawaiian
8.3% Portuguese
6.9% Irish
5.7% English
5.1% Puerto Rican
3.2% Mexican
2.5% French
2.2% Italian
1.9% Spanish
1.7% Scottish
1.5% Scotch-Irish
1.5% Swedish
1.1% Polish
1.1% Dutch
1.0% Norwegian
There were 64,382 households, out of which 32.2% had children under the age of 18 living with them, 50.6% were married couples living together, 13.2% had a woman whose husband did not live with her, and 30.4% were non-families. 23.1% of all households were made up of individuals, and 8.0% had someone living alone who was 65 years of age or older. The average household size was 2.75 and the average family size was 3.24.

The age distribution was 26.1% under 18, 8.2% from 18 to 24, 26.2% from 25 to 44, 26.0% from 45 to 64, and 13.5% who were 65 or older. The median age was 39 years. For every 100 females, there were 100 males. For every 100 females age 18 and over, there were 98 males.

41.3% of the people on Hawaii island are religious, meaning they affiliate with a religion. 18.4% are Catholic; 3.7% are of another Christian faith; 5.1% are LDS; 5.0% are of an Eastern faith; 0.1% are Muslim.

Government and infrastructure

County government

Executive authority is vested in the mayor of Hawaii County, who is elected for a four-year term. Since 2004, the election by the voters has been on a nonpartisan basis. In 2020, Mitch Roth was elected mayor, succeeding Harry Kim, who lost reelection after being defeated in the primary election. Legislative authority is vested in a nine-member County Council. Members of the County Council are elected on a nonpartisan basis to two-year terms from single-member districts. As of December 2016, Hawaii County Council has a female supermajority for the first time, with six women and three men.

Administrative districts were originally based on the traditional land divisions called Moku of Ancient Hawaii. Some more heavily populated districts have since been split into North and South districts to make them more comparable on a population basis.

The number following each district is the Tax Map Key (TMK) number, used to locate state property information. They are assigned in a counter-clockwise order beginning on the eastern side of the island.

County council districts do not directly match the property tax districts because of the variation in the population density of voters in urban areas to rural areas; Hilo & Kailua (Kailua-Kona) towns are densely populated areas, while other districts such as Kaū, Puna, Hāmākua, and North & South Kohala are more sparsely populated.

Several government functions are administered at the county level that are at the state or municipal level in other states. For example, the county has its own office of liquor control.

State government
Hawaii Department of Public Safety previously operated the Kulani Correctional Facility in Hawaii County, on the Island of Hawaii. In 2009, the Hawaii Department of Public Safety announced that Kulani Correctional Facility would close.

Presidential election results

Localities

Census-designated places

Ainaloa
Black Sands
Captain Cook
Discovery Harbour
Eden Roc
Fern Acres
Fern Forest
Halaula
Hawaiian Acres
Hawaiian Beaches
Hawaiian Ocean View
Hawaiian Paradise Park
Hawi
Hilo
Holualoa
Honalo
Honaunau-Napoopoo
Honokaa
Honomu
Kahaluu-Keauhou
Kailua
Kaiminani
Kalaoa
Kalapana
Kaloko
Kamaili
Kapaau
Keaau
Kealakekua
Kukuihaele
Kurtistown
Laupahoehoe
Leilani Estates
Mauna Loa Estates
Mountain View
Naalehu
Nanawale Estates
Orchidlands Estates
Paauilo
Pahala
Pahoa
Papaikou
Paukaa
Pepeekeo
Puako
Royal Hawaiian Estates
Seaview
Tiki Gardens
Volcano
Volcano Golf Course
Waikoloa Beach Resort
Waikoloa Village
Waimea
Wainaku
Waiohinu

Other communities

Ahualoa
Haʻena
Hakalau
Kawaihae
Keauhou
Keokea
Miloliʻi
Nīnole
ʻŌʻōkala
Paauhau
Pāpaʻaloa

National protected areas
 Ala Kahakai National Historic Trail
 Hakalau Forest National Wildlife Refuge
 Hawaii Volcanoes National Park
 Kaloko-Honokōhau National Historical Park
 Kona Forest National Wildlife Refuge
 Puuhonua o Hōnaunau National Historical Park
 Puukoholā Heiau National Historic Site

Economy

Top employers
According to the county's 2010 Comprehensive Annual Financial Report, the top employers in the county are:

Education

 University of Hawaii at Hilo
 University of the Nations
 Hawaii Community College

Hawaii Department of Education operates public schools in Hawaii County.

Sister cities
Hawaii County's sister cities are:

 Cabugao, Philippines (2017)
 Gokseong, South Korea (2011)
 Kumejima, Japan (2011)
 Nago, Japan (1986)
 Ormoc, Philippines (2011)
 Ōshima, Japan (1962)
 Réunion, France (2012)
 La Serena, Chile (1994)
 Shibukawa, Japan (1997)
 Sumoto, Japan (2000)
 Yurihama, Japan (1996)

References

External links

 Official Hawaii County website
 Hawaii Volcanoes National Park
 Economic background from the Revision of the Hawaii County General Plan

 
Hawaii
1905 establishments in Hawaii
Populated places established in 1905